"A Time to Speak" is a 1965 Australian television film, which aired on ABC. It is a period drama set around 1900. It was written by Noel Robinson. This was the third production to appear in three weeks.

Premise
In the year 1900, a religious community, the Community, is led by the Elder. One of the Community's inhabitants, Esther, visits a local doctor, Gilly, asking if he can look after a young girl, who is mentally impaired. Gill recommends that the girl follow a course of action. The girl returns to the Community.

Several days later the girl dies. The doctor diagnoses pneumonia and wonders what impact the Elder has. Gilly's wife Anne wants her husband to move away like their friend Chad.

Cast
Raymond Westwell as the Elder
Wyn Roberts as the doctor, Gilly
Keith Eden as Chad Jensen
Joan MacArthur as the leader's wife, Sister Esther
Patsy King as Annie, the doctor's wife
George Whaley as John
Michael Howley as Matthew
Martin Magee as Benjamin
Edward Howell as Man

Production
It was filmed in Melbourne with location footage at Montsalvat near Eltham.  Director Patrick Barton said he chose Montsalvat because it had a huge meeting hall, a courtyard and the inside of a cottage. Cast members Raymond Westwell and Joan MacArthur were married in real life. ABV-2's outside broadcast unit, normally used for sport and actuality programs was used for the location scenes.

Reception
The Australian Woman's Weekly TV critic called it "a meaty play", and said she "particularly liked the understated ending".

The Canberra Times said it was "a good play, well suited to television, and simply loaded with righteousness enough for all those people who found the honest, healthy lust of The Swagmanwas not their . . , cup of tea."

The TV critic for The Sydney Morning Herald said the play was "an uncommonly arresting drama about the conflict of personalities" in which the director "used the austere and sombre setting of a farm community lo good effect. Some of the scenes were rather abrupt, as was the ending, but generally tension was maintained well."

References

External links
 
 A Time to Speak at AustLit

1965 television plays
1965 Australian television episodes
1960s Australian television plays
Black-and-white television episodes
Wednesday Theatre (season 1) episodes